Michel Johannes Doesburg (born 10 August 1968 in Beverwijk) is a retired Dutch professional football player.

Club career
Doesburg played for several Dutch clubs before moving abroad when he joined Scottish side Motherwell in 1998, moving to Dunfermline Athletic in 2000. He returned to Holland in 2002, when he signed a half-year deal with FC Zwolle.

Doesburg was named chief scout at AZ in November 2015.

References

External links
 Career stats

1968 births
Living people
Sportspeople from Beverwijk
Association football defenders
Dutch footballers
HFC Haarlem players
FC Wageningen players
SC Heerenveen players
AZ Alkmaar players
Motherwell F.C. players
Dunfermline Athletic F.C. players
PEC Zwolle players
Dutch expatriate footballers
Expatriate footballers in Scotland
Dutch expatriate sportspeople in Scotland
Eredivisie players
Scottish Premier League players
AZ Alkmaar non-playing staff
Association football scouts
Footballers from North Holland